The , sometimes also called the Botanical Garden of Kawaguchi-City, is a city park and botanical garden located at Araijuku 700, Kawaguchi, Saitama, Japan.  Admission is 300 yen for adults and 100 yen for children. 

The garden was established in 1967, and contains fountains, plum trees, and topiary pieces, as well as greenhouses with collections including banana, bougainvillea, lotus (Nymphaea), orchids, and succulent plants.

See also
List of botanical gardens in Japan

References
BGCI entry
Japan Geographic TV videos
https://web.archive.org/web/20100924055720/http://digi-promotion.com/tokyo-surroundings/attractions-tokyo-surroundings/kawaguchi_green_center_saitama.html
Japanese Website http://greencenter.1110city.com/#

Botanical gardens in Japan
Gardens in Saitama Prefecture
Buildings and structures in Kawaguchi, Saitama